Alfonso Tomas "Atom" Pagaduan Araullo (born October 19, 1982) is a Filipino journalist, model, television presenter, triathlete, occasional actor, and radio host.

Araullo is a national Goodwill Ambassador for the United Nations High Commissioner for Refugees and was conferred the title after undertaking missions to visit displaced families in Mindanao, Bangladesh, and Jordan.

He is also an advocate for environmental conservation, notably in marine ecosystems. He received a star on the Eastwood City Walk of Fame on November 21, 2017.

Early life and education
Atom Araullo was born as Alfonso Tomas Pagaduan Araullo on October 19, 1982, the youngest child and only son of Miguel (nicknamed "Mike") and Carol Araullo (née Pagaduan). He has an older sister, Alessandra "Sandra" Araullo-Gonzales, who is a triathlete as well. Being the son of an activist family, Araullo spent most of his early childhood days with his parents battling it out during the Marcos dictatorship. This has exposed him to the political struggle in the country. During his early elementary school days, his parents exposed him to sports and the theater. As a result, he became part of several plays and has joined various competitions as a triathlete.

He finished his elementary education at Ateneo de Manila University, and his high school education at the Philippine Science High School Main Campus. Araullo graduated with a Bachelor of Science degree in applied physics from the University of the Philippines Diliman. There he became a member of the League of Filipino Students (LFS), as well as the chairperson of the Student Alliance for the Advancement of Democratic Rights - UP (STAND-UP). He also won as Councilor in the UP Diliman University Student Council elections of 2003, garnering the highest number of votes.

Career

1993–2003: Early beginnings 
During his childhood years, Atom Araullo was part of 5 and Up (produced by Probe Productions, Inc.). He also used to host the Studio 23 morning show Breakfast, The National Quiz Bee, Probe Media Foundation Inc.'s Kabataan Xpress, Basta Sports and Kalye: Mga Kwento ng Lansangan with Anthony Taberna and Sol Aragones.

2004–2017:  Beginnings as GMA News reporter and transfer to ABS-CBN 
Araullo started his news-reporting career with GMA Network where he featured in the "ATOMic Sports" segment of 24 Oras. He moved to ABS-CBN in 2005. He hosted Red Alert and Umagang Kay Ganda.

Initially rumored, Araullo confirmed his resignation as a news reporter of ABS-CBN News and Current Affairs, specifically from his reportorial duties on TV Patrol, Bandila, and the ABS-CBN News Channel (ANC) in late August 2016. He explained that he wanted to explore opportunities and pursue other interests, debunking the rumor that he opted for resignation because of his strong opinions.

2017–present: Return to GMA Network 
In September 2017, Araullo left ABS-CBN. He returned to GMA Network that same month, where he focused on making documentaries such as Philippine Seas (2017) and The Atom Araullo Specials (2018–present). Araullo acted as an interim anchor for 24 Oras since August 2018 when Mike Enriquez took a medical leave.

"Munting Bisig", an episode from the Atom Araulo Specials, won a silver award in the human concerns and social issues category at the Cannes Corporate Media and TV Awards. The episode also won in the social issues category at the New York Festivals TV and Film Awards 2022 and best Asian documentary at the Asia Content Awards.

Acting career
Araullo made his acting debut with a lead role in a noir crime drama film Citizen Jake directed by Mike De Leon in 2018, acting as a son of corrupt senator-turned-citizen journalist Jacobo "Jake" Herrera Jr.

Awards and nominations

Filmography

Film

Radio
Red Alert sa DZMM (DZMM Radyo Patrol 630) (2013–2017)

Notes

References

External links 
 
 GMA Network profile

1982 births
Living people
GMA Integrated News and Public Affairs people
GMA Network personalities
ABS-CBN personalities
ABS-CBN News and Current Affairs people
Ateneo de Manila University alumni
Filipino male film actors
Filipino male models
Filipino television news anchors
Male actors from Metro Manila
People from Quezon City
Tagalog people
University of the Philippines Diliman alumni